Marilyn Chris (born May 19, 1938) is an American actress, possibly best known as Wanda Webb Wolek on the ABC soap opera, One Life to Live.

Education
Born in Brooklyn, New York, Chris attended the High School of Performing Arts and City College of New York.

Career
She began her acting career in the 1950s at The Living Theatre.

With appearances on television shows such as NBC's Law & Order and Fame, she is known by longtime soap fans as Wanda Wolek #1 on the ABC soap opera, One Life to Live, a role she played from 1972 through 1976, and from 1980 through 1994. Earlier in her career she played Edie Hoffman on the ABC soap opera All My Children.

She has appeared in such films as Love With The Proper Stranger (1963), The People Next Door (1970), The Honeymoon Killers (1970), 
The Black Marble (1980), and Trees Lounge (1996).

She has also acted and directed for the theater.
Her Broadway credits include roles in Lenny and Brighton Beach Memoirs. She received an Obie Award and a Drama Desk Award and an Outer Critics Circle Award and a Variety Critics Poll for her performance in Kaddish, directed by Robert Kalfin at the Chelsea Theater Center.

Personal life
She had been married to her second husband, actor Lee Wallace, since December 14, 1975 until his death in on 20 December 2020; the couple had one child, Paul.

References

Sources
 Chelsea on the Edge: The Adventures of an American Theater, Davi Napoleon. Includes discussion of Robert Kalfin's off-Broadway multi-media production of Kaddish.Iowa State University Press. , 1991.

External links

Actresses from New York City
American soap opera actresses
American television actresses
American film actresses
American stage actresses
Obie Award recipients
People from Brooklyn
1938 births
Living people
21st-century American women